John Cairns (1857–1922) was a United Presbyterian Church minister, writer and biographer. He was born on 13 April 1857 at Stichill in Roxburghshire. He was the son of Rev. David Cairns, United Presbyterian Church minister at Stichill, and of Elizabeth Williamson Smith. He was educated at Edrom Parish School in Berwickshire and at University of Edinburgh where he graduated M.A. in 1878. He trained for the ministry at United Presbyterian College, Edinburgh and at Leipzig University. He wrote a biography of his uncle, John Cairns in the "Famous Scots Series". He died in Edinburgh on 13 May 1922.

Career as Minister 
 June 1882 –  Licensed by U. P. Presbytery of Kelso
 1882-3 – Assistant at Dumbarton Bridgend
 1883-4 – Assistant at Dumfries Buccleuch Street
 16 Oct 1884 –  Ordained and inducted as Minister at Dumfries Buccleuch Street
 April 1922 – Retired as Minister at Dumfries Buccleuch Street

Administrative Posts with UF Church 
 1907-8 –  Vice-Convener of Continental Committee
 1909  –  Convener of Continental Committee
 1913–22 – Convener of Colonial and Continental Committee

Publications 
 Principal Cairns. Edinburgh: Oliphant, Anderson and Ferrier, 1903, ("Famous Scots Series")
 Our Continental Mission Field and its Historic Background.  Edinburgh: United Free Church of Scotland, 1921.

Sources 
 The Fasti of the United Free Church of Scotland, 1900–1929. Edited by the Rev. John Alexander Lamb. Edinburgh and London: Oliver & Boyd, 1956. p. 102.
 Scotlandspeople internet site: www.scotlandspeople.gov.uk.

References

External links

1857 births
1922 deaths
Scottish biographers
Scottish non-fiction writers
19th-century Scottish writers
Alumni of the University of Edinburgh
19th-century Scottish clergy
20th-century Scottish clergy
20th-century Scottish writers
Ministers of the United Presbyterian Church (Scotland)
Ministers of the United Free Church of Scotland